There are 13 U.S. metropolitan areas with sports teams competing in the four major leagues: Major League Baseball, National Hockey League, National Football League and National Basketball Association. 

Only the country's two largest metropolitan areas—New York and Los Angeles—have at least two teams in each major sports league.

Overview by city
Italicized teams play outside the city limits of the metropolitan area's core city or cities; the specific location is given in parentheses. The core city or cities of a metropolitan area are identified in this reference.

Analysis

Principal city versus metropolitan areas
The only metropolitan areas with a team in each sport that plays within the limits of its principal city are Chicago, Denver, Detroit, and Philadelphia. Chicago, with its two MLB teams, is the only one of these with five teams playing within city limits. (All are named for the city.) 

In the Twin Cities area, three of the teams play in Minneapolis and one plays in St. Paul, although all four teams are named for the state of Minnesota, not their cities. 

All other areas have at least one sport represented solely by a team (or teams) that plays in a city's suburbs.

Los Angeles had teams from all four major sports play within its city limits from 2016, when the NFL's Rams moved to the Los Angeles Memorial Coliseum, until 2020, when they moved into a new stadium in Inglewood. Los Angeles now has four major sports teams playing within city limits: two NBA, one NHL and one MLB team. (Seven of its metropolitan area's eight teams named after it, all except the NHL's Anaheim Ducks.)

New York City has nine major sports teams and five playing within its city limits, but both its NFL teams (the New York Giants and New York Jets) play in East Rutherford, New Jersey. (All of the New York teams except the NHL's New Jersey Devils and the NBA's Brooklyn Nets are named for the city.)

Regional distribution

Each of the four census regions of the United States established by the United States Census Bureau contains at least three of the metropolitan areas with at least one team in each of the four major sports. Three of the areas are in the Northeastern United States (New York, Boston, and Philadelphia), three are in the Midwestern United States (Chicago, Detroit, and Minneapolis-St. Paul), three are in the Southern United States (Washington, D.C., Dallas, and Miami), and four are in the Western United States (Los Angeles, San Francisco, Denver, and Phoenix).

Smallest population with all four
The least-populous metropolitan area with at least one team in each of the four major sports is Denver, whose estimated population is 2,853,077. However, Denver is the hub of an urban corridor of about 4.8 million people.

Minnesota is the least populous state to have a team in each major sport. It has almost three million fewer people than Virginia, the most populous state with no major sports teams.

Largest population without a team

The largest television market area with no teams in the four major leagues is the Hartford & New Haven (Connecticut) area. Hartford was formerly home to the NHL's Hartford Whalers, who moved to Raleigh in 1997 and are now the Carolina Hurricanes.

The largest television market areas that have never had a team in the four major leagues are Austin, Texas, which gained an MLS team in 2021 (Austin FC), and the West Palm Beach-Ft. Pierce (Florida) area, though that is usually considered part of the territory of Miami-area teams.

Using the Primary Statistical Areas defined by the U.S. Census Bureau, the most-populous metropolitan area without a team in any of the four major leagues (as of the 2010 U.S. Census) is the Hartford–Springfield area, although several minor league professional teams play in the area and it is located between the larger metro areas of New York and Boston. The Hampton Roads metro area is the second-largest metro area without a major sports team and has never had one. Before the addition of the Vegas Golden Knights in 2017, the Las Vegas Valley had been the largest metro area without a team.

Largest population without all four leagues represented
Houston, which lacks an NHL team, is the largest metropolitan area that does not have a franchise in all four major professional sports. Los Angeles had been the largest such area from 1995 until 2016, when the St. Louis Rams moved back to California.

Cities with two teams from one of the four leagues
The sport that most commonly has two teams in one metropolitan area is baseball, with multiple teams in Chicago (since 1901), New York (since 1962), Los Angeles (since 1961), and the San Francisco Bay Area (since 1968). Throughout the first half of the 20th century, Boston, St. Louis, and Philadelphia also had two baseball franchises, but one team from each city moved in the 1950s. New York had three teams until two moved in 1958. Only Chicago has had the same two baseball teams since the American League was established in 1901. In 2006, Philadelphia was the largest television market without two baseball teams, with Dallas being the next-largest.

New York and Los Angeles are the only two metropolitan areas with two or more teams in all four major sports. New York has MLB's Yankees and Mets, the NBA's Knicks and Nets, the NFL's Giants and Jets, and the NHL's Rangers, Islanders, and Devils.  Los Angeles has MLB's Dodgers and Angels, the NBA's Lakers and Clippers, the NFL's Rams and Chargers, and the NHL's Kings and Ducks.

The Washington, D.C., combined statistical area (although not its media market nor its metropolitan area) also includes the city of Baltimore as part of the Baltimore–Washington metropolitan area. Using this definition, the region also has two MLB teams (the Washington Nationals and Baltimore Orioles) and two NFL teams (the Washington Commanders and Baltimore Ravens).

Two teams in each of the four leagues
The only areas with at least two franchises in all four sports are New York and Los Angeles, which are the largest and second-largest cities and the two largest metropolitan areas in the United States. In New York, four of the metro area's nine major sports franchises play outside the city limits and three outside the state of New York: the NFL's Jets and Giants, and the NHL's Devils all play in New Jersey. The NHL's Islanders play in UBS Arena in Elmont, New York, on Long Island. However, all teams have "New York" in their name except the Devils, who identify with New Jersey, and the Brooklyn Nets, who are named for the borough where they play.

In Los Angeles, four of the area's eight teams play in other cities (the Ducks and Angels play in Anaheim, while the Chargers and Rams play in Inglewood). During the construction of SoFi Stadium, the Rams played in the LA city limits while the Chargers played in Carson. The Clippers currently play in downtown Los Angeles, sharing Crypto.com Arena with the Lakers, but plan to move to the Intuit Dome by the 2024–25 NBA season.

Since the formation of the NBA in 1946, New York is the only city to consistently host at least one team in each of the four leagues every year.

Most recent city with a team from each league
The most recent city to be added to this list is Los Angeles, which regained the football Rams in 2016 after they had played the prior 21 seasons in St. Louis. (In 2017, the Chargers also moved to the city from San Diego, becoming the Los Angeles Chargers.)

States with all four leagues represented, but not in one metro area
Ohio is the only state that has teams from all four major sports but no metropolitan area with all four. Its teams include the NFL's Cincinnati Bengals and Cleveland Browns; MLB's Cincinnati Reds and Cleveland Guardians; the NBA's Cleveland Cavaliers; and the NHL's Columbus Blue Jackets, the only team outside Cleveland and Cincinnati.

While both football teams of the New York City metropolitan area play in New Jersey, the state of New York still has all four major sports leagues represented with the NFL's Buffalo Bills.

Most populous state without all four sports leagues
After the NHL's Atlanta Thrashers moved to Winnipeg and became the Jets in 2011, Georgia became the most populous state without teams in all four sports. Metro Atlanta became the third-largest metro area (at the time) not to have teams in all four sports (after Los Angeles and Houston). With the return of the Los Angeles Rams in 2016, Atlanta became the second largest metro area without all four leagues behind Houston. Georgia is now home to the NFL's Atlanta Falcons, MLB's Atlanta Braves, and the NBA's Atlanta Hawks. The Falcons and Hawks currently play within the city limits of Atlanta; the Braves moved just outside the city in 2017 to the Vinings/Smyrna area in Cobb County. The Braves' new stadium is within a small slice of Cobb County that has always had an Atlanta mailing address.

Previously, North Carolina had been the most populous state without teams in all four sports, having edged out New Jersey when the southern state's population surpassed the northern one's. Both lack a Major League Baseball team, though three teams (the New York Yankees, New York Mets and the Philadelphia Phillies) play in metropolitan areas that include parts of New Jersey. North Carolina is home to the NFL's Carolina Panthers and NBA's Charlotte Hornets, who both play in Charlotte, as well as the NHL's Carolina Hurricanes, who play in Raleigh. New Jersey is home to the NFL's New York Giants and New York Jets, who play in the Meadowlands Sports Complex in East Rutherford, as well as the NHL's New Jersey Devils, who play in Newark.

Most populous state with no major league teams
Virginia remains the most populous state without a single big-league team in any sport, although residents of  Northern Virginia have access to teams in Washington, D.C., and, at a stretch, Baltimore; and southern Virginia residents have access to the Carolina Hurricanes, the only major-league team in the Raleigh-Durham area. Additionally, two of the four D.C.-area teams, the Washington Capitals and Washington Commanders, have their operational headquarters and training facilities in Northern Virginia.

Alabama is the most populous state that has neither a major-league team nor a connection to a media market area with a major-league team. However this distinction changes depending on if the Atlanta media market is defined to extend into Alabama. If it is, then Iowa is the most populous state with neither a team nor a connection to a media market with a team.

Canadian cities
Three of the four major leagues (MLB, the NBA and the NHL), have at least one team in Canada. Thus, although it is not a U.S. city, Toronto is notable because it has MLB (Blue Jays), NBA (Raptors), NHL (Maple Leafs) and MLS (Toronto FC) teams, plus a professional Canadian football team, the Toronto Argonauts. The Argonauts play in the Canadian Football League, which meets the definition of a major league because it represents the highest level of play in its country. Currently an all-Canadian circuit, the CFL had teams in the United States from 1993 until 1995.

There has often been speculation that the NFL will seek to install a team in Toronto, which is larger than many NFL cities and the second-largest city in North America (behind Mexico City) without an NFL team, but the league insists it has no plans for expansion. The NFL allowed the Buffalo Bills to play one regular-season game a year at Toronto's Rogers Centre for several years in the early 21st century, as the Bills' profits depend on a considerable Southern Ontario fan base. The first two games in the Toronto series did not directly conflict with the CFL, as they were scheduled for December, after the end of the CFL season. The series was put on hiatus after the 2013 season; current Bills owner Terry Pegula, who bought the team after the 2014 death of founding owner Ralph Wilson, formally ended the Toronto experiment.

Of the other eight current CFL cities, two have no other major sports franchises and the other six have an NHL franchise. Of these cities, two formerly had two major league teams plus a CFL franchise. Montreal, the second-most populous Canadian city, had the Montreal Expos MLB team, which moved to Washington, D.C. It still hosts the NHL's Canadiens and the CFL's Alouettes. Montreal also once had an NFL farm team, the WLAF Montreal Machine, before the WLAF became exclusively European. Additionally, Montreal is home to Canada's third MLS team, the Montreal Impact since 2012. Vancouver, the third-most populous Canadian metropolitan area, had the Vancouver Grizzlies NBA team, which moved to Memphis. It still hosts the NHL's Vancouver Canucks, CFL's BC Lions and MLS's Vancouver Whitecaps FC.

Cities formerly with teams in all four leagues
Cleveland, Kansas City, St. Louis, and Atlanta formerly hosted teams in all four major sports leagues at the same time. The two Missouri cities currently have two teams each, and the other two cities have three.
St. Louis was briefly a four-sport city (MLB's Cardinals, NFL's Cardinals, NBA's Hawks, and NHL's Blues) from 1967, when the NHL expanded, until 1968, when the Hawks left for Atlanta.
Kansas City had all four sports (MLB's Royals, NFL's Chiefs, NBA's Kings, and NHL's Scouts) from 1974 to 1976.  After two unsuccessful years in Kansas City, the Scouts moved to Denver (and later to New Jersey). The Kings moved to Sacramento in 1985.
Cleveland briefly held four-sport status (MLB's Indians, NFL's Browns, NBA's Cavaliers, and NHL's Barons) when the Oakland Seals moved there in 1976 as the Cleveland Barons, only to lose it when the Barons merged with the Minnesota North Stars in 1978. The Cleveland Browns relocation controversy left the city without an active NFL team from 1996 to 1999, when the NFL officially regarded the Browns as suspended.
Atlanta had teams from all four sports from 1972 until 1980, when the NHL's Flames moved to Calgary; and from 1999 until 2011, when the Thrashers moved to Winnipeg. Atlanta is the only city to have lost four-sport status, regained it, and then lost it a second time.

Cities that have lost, then regained four-sport status are Boston, Detroit, Chicago, Los Angeles, Minneapolis–St. Paul, and the San Francisco Bay Area.
Boston had the Yanks of the NFL at the start of the four-major-sport era in 1946, along with the Red Sox, Celtics, Bruins, and Braves. Four-sport status ended when the Yanks became the New York Bulldogs in 1949, and then resumed with the formation of the Boston Patriots (now the New England Patriots) in 1960.
Detroit had a charter franchise of the NBA (then called the Basketball Association of America) in 1946, but the Falcons folded after one season. Detroit rejoined the four-sport club when the Fort Wayne Pistons moved to Detroit in 1957.
Chicago had a BAA/NBA team fold in 1950, then attracted an expansion franchise in 1961 only to see it move to Baltimore two years later. Chicago rejoined the four-sport club in 1966 with the expansion Bulls.
The San Francisco Bay Area had teams in all four sports from the NHL expansion in 1967 until the Seals left for Cleveland in 1976. It regained four-sport status when the expansion San Jose Sharks joined the NHL in 1991. Oakland alone had a grand slam without help from San Francisco from 1971 (when the Golden State Warriors arrived) to 1976.
Minneapolis–St. Paul became a member with the arrival of the Minnesota Timberwolves as an expansion NBA franchise in 1989, only to see the NHL's North Stars depart for Dallas in 1993. The Twin Cities regained their status with the NHL's expansion Minnesota Wild in 2000.
Greater Los Angeles became a four-sport city in 1967 and remained so for 28 years. In 1993, it joined New York in having two teams in each of the four major sports (MLB's Dodgers and Angels, NFL's Rams and Raiders, NBA's Lakers and Clippers, and NHL's Kings and Ducks), but lost both of its NFL teams in 1995. The Rams moved back to Los Angeles in 2016, restoring the city to four-sport status. Two years later, the city once again joined New York in having two teams from each of the four leagues with the arrival of the former San Diego Chargers.

If the American Basketball Association (1967–1976) were considered a major professional sports league, three more cities would be former four-sport metropolises. Pittsburgh—home to the MLB Pirates, the NFL Steelers and the NHL Penguins—also hosted the ABA's Pittsburgh Condors, originally called the Pipers, in 1967 and from 1969 until the team's demise in 1972. St. Louis would have regained four-sport status between 1974 and 1976, when the city was home to the Spirits of St. Louis. And Minneapolis–St. Paul would have been a four-sport city from 1967 to 1969, having hosted the ABA's Minnesota Muskies in 1967–68 and the Minnesota Pipers in 1968–69.

If the World Hockey Association (1972–1979) were considered a major league, Houston would have made the list; the Houston Aeros operated from 1972 to 1978, but were  left out of the NHL-WHA merger negotiations and folded before the merger. Under the same assumption, Cleveland would have joined the four-sports club in 1972 with the arrival of the WHA Cleveland Crusaders, which were displaced in 1976 by the NHL's Barons.

If the ABA and WHA were both considered major leagues, then San Diego would have made the list from fall 1974 through fall 1975. Alongside the MLB Padres (since 1969) and the AFL/NFL Chargers (1961 to 2016), there were the ABA Conquistadors/Sails (1972–1975) and the WHA Mariners (1974–1977).

Major League Soccer
Major League Soccer in the United States was founded in 1993, and has been active since 1996. Of the 13 metro areas with Big Four teams, 11 also host MLS franchises as well. Detroit and Phoenix currently do not have Major League Soccer teams.

Teams that play outside city limits are indicated in italics, followed by their locations of play.

Miami and the San Francisco Bay Area have lost and regained five-sport status. The former lost it in 2002 when the Miami Fusion folded, and the latter in 2006 when the San Jose Earthquakes moved to Houston to become the Dynamo. The Bay Area resumed being a five-sport city in 2008 when the Earthquakes were reactivated, Miami in 2020 with the arrival of Inter Miami CF.

Of cities that formerly held four-sport status, only Atlanta, Kansas City, and St. Louis have current MLS franchises. 

No Ohio city can claim five-sport (or four-sport) status, but the state itself can via Cincinnati, Cleveland, and Columbus sports teams with Columbus Crew SC and FC Cincinnati.

The debut of MLS's Toronto FC in 2007 gave Toronto five major professional sports teams, although its football team plays in the Canadian Football League.

See also

Multiple major sports championship seasons
List of American and Canadian cities by number of major professional sports franchises
List of major professional sports teams in the United States and Canada

Notes and references

External links
Google Maps: America's Ultimate Sports Cities

Sports in the United States by populated place
Sports teams in the United States by city